Clavicoccus erinaceus is an extinct species of mealybug in the family Pseudococcidae. It was endemic to Oʻahu, where it lived on its host plant, the now critically endangered greenflower Indian mallow, Abutilon sandwicense.

References

Hemiptera of North America
Endemic fauna of Hawaii
Insects described in 1948
Extinct insects since 1500
Extinct Hawaiian animals
Taxonomy articles created by Polbot
Pseudococcidae